Cornularia is a genus of soft corals in the suborder Stolonifera.

Species
The World Register of Marine Species includes the following species in the genus:

Cornularia atlantica Johnson, 1861
Cornularia aurantiaca Stimpson, 1855
Cornularia australis Busk, 1867
Cornularia cornucopiae (Pallas, 1766)
Cornularia pabloi McFadden & van Ofwegen, 2012

References

Cornulariidae
Octocorallia genera